The 2007 Svenska Cupen Final took place on September 27, 2007 at Fredriksskans in Kalmar. The match was contested by Kalmar FF, who then was placed 4th in Allsvenskan, and leaders IFK Göteborg. This was the first final to be played at the venue of the home drawn team. Kalmar FF, who before the match had won the cup two times, played their first final since 1987. IFK Göteborg, who had won the cup four times, played their first final since 2004.

Kalmar FF won the final comfortably after a strong performance. Brazilian striker César Santin scored two goals and Patrik Ingelsten one.

Road to the Final

 Square brackets [ ] represent the opposition's division.

Match details

See also
2007 Svenska Cupen

References

External links
Svenska Cupen at svenskfotboll.se

2007
Cupen
Kalmar FF matches
IFK Göteborg matches
Football in Kalmar
September 2007 sports events in Europe
Sports competitions in Kalmar